Anthony Puletua (born 25 June 1979), also known by the nickname of "TP", is a former professional rugby league footballer who last played for the Hull Kingston Rovers in the Super League. A New Zealand and Samoan international, Puletua previously played for the Penrith Panthers in the National Rugby League competition, primarily as  forward.

Puletua joined the Hull Kingston Rovers, on loan in 2015 from the Salford Red Devils. He made 13 appearances, scoring one try for the Hull Kingston Rovers, and retired on 18 September 2015.

Background
Puletua was born in Auckland, New Zealand. He is of Samoan descent.

Penrith Panthers
Puletua played his junior rugby league with the St Mary's Saints before being signed by the Penrith Panthers. Puletua made his début for the Penrith Panthers in 1997 and played at second row in the Panthers team which defeated the Sydney Roosters in the 2003 NRL Grand final. As 2003 NRL premiers, the Panthers travelled to England to face Super League VIII champions, the Bradford Bulls in the 2004 World Club Challenge.  Puletua played at second-row forward in the Panthers' 22–4 loss. He was captain of the team from January 2006. Puletua's brother, Frank, also played for the Penrith Panthers, retiring from professional rugby league in April 2011. On 4 October 2006, TP was selected to be a part of the Perinth Panthers' Team Legends. Used to celebrate the 40th anniversary of the Panthers, Puletua was alongside Penrith legends Mark Geyer, Brad Fitler and Rhys Wesser.

St Helens
Puletua joined St Helens at the end of the 2008 season on a three-year deal.

He played in the 2009 Super League Grand Final defeat by the Leeds Rhinos at Old Trafford.

He played in the 2011 Super League Grand Final defeat by the Leeds Rhinos at Old Trafford.

Salford Red Devils
Puletua joined the Salford Red Devils for the 2014 season. He made 26 appearances for the club in 2014, but was not registered as a player for the 2015 season due to salary cap issues.

Hull KR

Puletua joined Hull Kingston Rovers mid-season in 2015 on a season-long loan from Salford, and announced that he would retire from the game following his spell with Hull KR.

Representative football
Puletua represented the New Zealand national team on 22 occasions following his début in 1998, including the 2000 World Cup. His last selection was for New Zealand against Australia in the ANZAC Test on 20 April 2007 as a replacement for the injured David Kidwell. After that, he switched his allegiance to Samoa.

Puletua was named in the Samoa squad for the 2008 Rugby League World Cup, and played in three matches. In 2009 he was named as part of the Samoan side for the Pacific Cup.

Puletua was called up to the Samoan squad as an injury replacement during the 2013 World Cup.

Career highlights
 First Grade Debut: 1997 – Round 10, Penrith v Perth Reds at the WACA, 4 May
 Representative Debut: 1998 – Australia vs New Zealand, Suncorp Stadium, 9 October
 Premierships: 2003 – member of the Grand final winning Panthers team that defeated the Sydney Roosters, 18–6

References

External links

St Helens profile
Penrith Panthers profile
NZRL profile
Saints Heritage Society profile
Warriors prop opts for Samoa

1979 births
Living people
Exiles rugby league team players
Hull Kingston Rovers players
Junior Kiwis players
New Zealand emigrants to Australia
New Zealand expatriate sportspeople in England
New Zealand national rugby league team players
New Zealand sportspeople of Samoan descent
New Zealand rugby league players
Penrith Panthers players
Penrith Panthers captains
Rugby league players from Auckland
Rugby league props
Rugby league second-rows
Salford Red Devils players
Samoa national rugby league team captains
Samoa national rugby league team players
St Helens R.F.C. players